Avia Air was an airline based in Aruba.

Code data

IATA Code: 3R
ICAO Code: ARB
Callsign: Aviair

History

Avia Air suspended service in November 2003 and was working to restructure its operations under bankruptcy protection.

Fleet

Short 360-200
Embraer EMB 110 Bandeirante

References

External links
Aircraft pictures

Defunct airlines of Aruba
Airlines disestablished in 2003
Defunct airlines of the Netherlands Antilles
2003 establishments in the Netherlands Antilles